Goose Neck Tower is an 87-metre concrete radio tower near Bell and Mendig in Western Germany. Built in 1976, it serves as an internal radio relay link for German electric and natural gas public utility company RWE.

Goose Neck Tower is one of RWE's few radio towers built in concrete. At the height of 24 meters, there is an observation deck open to tourists.

It is named after the mountain where it is located: .

Communication towers in Germany
Observation towers in Germany
Towers completed in 1976
1976 establishments in West Germany